John Gray is an American businessman and museum administrator. He was the director of the National Museum of American History until 2018 and a former president and CEO of the Autry National Center.

Career
Gray worked in commercial banking for 25 years and in the U.S. Small Business Administration.

He became CEO of the Museum of the American West in 1999. During his tenure, the museum merged with the Women of the West Museum and Southwest Museum of the American Indian.

In May 2012, Gray was named the new director of the National Museum of American History at the Smithsonian Institution, replacing retiring director Brent Glass. He retired from the position in 2018 and was succeeded by Anthea Hartig.

References

External links

Year of birth missing (living people)
Living people
Smithsonian Institution people
Directors of museums in the United States
20th-century American businesspeople